is a professional Japanese baseball player. He plays infielder for the Hiroshima Toyo Carp.

References 

2000 births
Living people
Baseball people from Hyōgo Prefecture
Japanese baseball players
Nippon Professional Baseball infielders
Hiroshima Toyo Carp players
[[Category:People from Takarazuka, Hyōgo]